Tymfi is a former municipality in the Ioannina regional unit, Epirus, Greece. Since the 2011 local government reform it is part of the municipality Zagori, of which it is a municipal unit. The municipal unit has an area of 428.296 km2. Population 862 (2011). The seat of the municipality was in Tsepelovo. It took its name from the Tymfi mountain.

Subdivisions
The municipal unit Tymfi is subdivided into the following communities:
Tsepelovo
Vradeto
Vrysochori
Iliochori
Kapesovo
Kipoi
Koukouli
Laista
Leptokarya
Negades
Skamneli
Fragkades

References

Zagori
Populated places in Ioannina (regional unit)

de:Tymfi